Milan Dimun (born 19 September 1996) is a Slovak footballer who currently plays for Fortuna Liga club DAC Dunajská Streda as a midfielder.

Club career

MFK Košice
Dimun made his professional Fortuna Liga debut for Košice on 18 October 2014 against ViOn Zlaté Moravce.

Cracovia 
On 10 June 2016 he signed a four-year deal with Cracovia.

Honours

Club
Cracovia
 Polish Cup: 2019–20
 Polish Supercup: 2020

References

External links
 MFK Košice profile
 
 Futbalnet profile
 

1996 births
Living people
Sportspeople from Košice
Slovak footballers
Slovak expatriate footballers
Association football midfielders
FC VSS Košice players
MKS Cracovia (football) players
FC DAC 1904 Dunajská Streda players
Slovak Super Liga players
2. Liga (Slovakia) players
Ekstraklasa players
Expatriate footballers in Poland
Slovak expatriate sportspeople in Poland
Slovak Christians